{{Taxobox
| name = Telluria
| domain = Bacteria
| phylum = Pseudomonadota
| classis = Betaproteobacteria
| ordo = Burkholderiales
| familia = Oxalobacteraceae
| genus = Telluria
| genus_authority = Bowman et al. 1993
| type_species = Telluria mixta| subdivision_ranks = Species
| subdivision =T. chitinolytica T. mixta}}Telluria'' is a genus of Gram-negative soil bacteria.

Telluria Crop Science' website https://telluria.in

References

Burkholderiales
Bacteria genera